The Roman Catholic Diocese of Borba  is a Roman Catholic diocese located in the city of Borba, Amazonas, in the Ecclesiastical province of Manaus in Brazil.

History
 13 July 1963: Established as Territorial Prelature of Borba from the Metropolitan Archdiocese of Manaus and Territorial Prelature of Parintins
 18 November 2022: Promoted as Diocese of Borba

Bishops
 Prelates of Borba (Latin Rite)
 Adriano Jaime Miriam Veigle, T.O.R. (1964.06.18 – 1988.07.06)
 José Afonso Ribeiro, T.O.R. (1988.07.06 – 2006.05.03)
 Elói Róggia, S.A.C. (2006.05.03 – 2017.09.20)
 Zenildo Luiz Pereira da Silva, C.Ss.R. (2017.09.20 - 2022.11.18)
 Diocesan Bishops
 Zenildo Luiz Pereira da Silva, C.Ss.R. (since 2022.11.18)

Coadjutor bishop
Zenildo Luiz Pereira da Silva, C.Ss.R. (2016-2017)

References

 GCatholic.org
 Catholic Hierarchy

Roman Catholic dioceses in Brazil
Christian organizations established in 1963
Borba, Diocese of
Roman Catholic dioceses and prelatures established in the 20th century